The Palo Santo Tour was the 2018-2019 concert tour by English synthpop band Years & Years. It was named after their second studio album, Palo Santo. The tour began in New York City at the Brooklyn Steel on 24 June 2018, and concluded in Coventry, England, on 15–16 June 2019.

On 15 October 2018, the band announced on Twitter that the last three North American dates were canceled due to "unforeseen scheduling issues", stating they hope to return again at another time.

On 15 February 2019, the band once again cancelled 4 shows in Asia due to unforeseen circumstances.

Background and development
Years & Years released their second studio album Palo Santo on 6 July 2018. A week before the album release, Years & Years embarked on Palo Santo Parties in three cities in the United States. On 18 June, Years & Years announced the tour via Twitter along with the European tour dates.

Setlist

Tour dates

Notes

Cancelled shows

Notes

References

2018 concert tours
2019 concert tours